Wayne Arnold (born May 16, 1984) is an American professional basketball player.

For the most part of his career, he played for professional basketball teams in Japan.

His greatest accomplishment was in 2016, when he was elected Most Valuable Player at the 2016 FIBA Africa Club Championship in Cairo, Egypt.

In February 2020, Arnold signed with Zamalek for the 2020 BAL season. However, the BAL season was cancelled due to the COVID-19 pandemic outbreak.

References

External links
 FIBA profile
 FOX Sports profile
 Asia-basket.com profile

1984 births
Living people
American expatriate basketball people in Angola
American expatriate basketball people in Austria
American expatriate basketball people in Egypt
American expatriate basketball people in Iceland
American expatriate basketball people in Japan
American expatriate basketball people in Qatar
American men's basketball players
Basketball players from Georgia (U.S. state)
Forwards (basketball)
Georgia Bulldogs basketball players
Guards (basketball)
Iwate Big Bulls players
Kapfenberg Bulls players
Los Angeles City Cubs men's basketball players
People from Lilburn, Georgia
San-en NeoPhoenix players
Shiga Lakes players
Zamalek SC basketball players
Tennessee State Tigers basketball players
Úrvalsdeild karla (basketball) players
Haukar men's basketball players
Al-Gharafa SC basketball players
AS Salé (basketball) players
Sportspeople from the Atlanta metropolitan area
Al Ahly basketball players